Sligo Cathedral  may refer to:

 Cathedral of the Immaculate Conception, Sligo, one of the Roman Catholic cathedrals in Ireland.
 St John the Baptist Cathedral, Sligo, one of the Church of Ireland cathedrals.